Argon compounds, the chemical compounds that contain the element argon, are rarely encountered due to the inertness of the argon atom. However, compounds of argon have been detected in inert gas matrix isolation, cold gases, and plasmas, and molecular ions containing argon have been made and also detected in space. One solid interstitial compound of argon, Ar1C60 is stable at room temperature. Ar1C60 was discovered by the CSIRO.

Argon ionises at 15.76 eV, which is higher than hydrogen, but lower than helium, neon or fluorine. Molecules containing argon can be van der Waals molecules held together very weakly by London dispersion forces. Ionic molecules can be bound by charge induced dipole interactions. With gold atoms there can be some covalent interaction. Several boron-argon bonds with significant covalent interactions have been also reported. Experimental methods used to study argon compounds have included inert gas matrices, infrared spectroscopy to study stretching and bending movements, microwave spectroscopy and far infrared to study rotation, and also visible and ultraviolet spectroscopy to study different electronic configurations including excimers. Mass spectroscopy is used to study ions. Computation methods have been used to theoretically compute molecule parameters, and predict new stable molecules. Computational ab initio methods used have included CCSD(T), MP2 (Møller–Plesset perturbation theory of the second order), CIS and CISD. For heavy atoms, effective core potentials are used to model the inner electrons, so that their contributions do not have to be individually computed. More powerful computers since the 1990s have made this kind of in silico study much more popular, being much less risky and simpler than an actual experiment. This article is mostly based on experimental or observational results.

The argon fluoride laser is important in photolithography of silicon chips. These lasers make a strong ultraviolet emission at 192 nm.

Argonium

Argonium (ArH+) is an ion combining a proton and an argon atom. It is found in interstellar space in diffuse atomic hydrogen gas where the fraction of molecular hydrogen H2 is in the range of 0.0001 to 0.001.

Argonium is formed when H2+ reacts with Ar atoms:

Ar +  → ArH+ + H

and it is also produced from Ar+ ions produced by cosmic rays and X-rays from neutral argon:

Ar+ + H2 → *ArH+ + H 1.49 eV.

When ArH+ encounters an electron, dissociative recombination can occur, but it is extremely slow for lower energy electrons, allowing ArH+ to survive for a much longer time than many other similar protonated cations.

ArH+ + e− → ArH* → Ar + H

Artificial ArH+ made from earthly Ar contains mostly the isotope 40Ar rather than the cosmically abundant 36Ar. Artificially it is made by an electric discharge through an argon-hydrogen mixture.

Natural occurrence
In the Crab Nebula, ArH+ occurs in several spots revealed by emission lines. The strongest place is in the Southern Filament. This is also the place with the strongest concentration of Ar+ and Ar2+ ions. The column density of ArH+ in the Crab Nebula is between 1012 and 1013 atoms per square centimeter. Possibly the energy required to excite the ions so that then can emit, comes from collisions with electrons or hydrogen molecules.

Cluster argon cations
The diargon cation,  has a binding energy of 1.29 eV.

The triargon cation  is linear, but has one Ar−Ar bond shorter than the other. Bond lengths are 2.47 and 2.73 ångströms. The dissociation energy to Ar and Ar2+ is 0.2 eV. In line with the molecule's asymmetry, the charge is calculated as +0.10, +0.58 and +0.32 on each argon atom, so that it greatly resembles  bound to a neutral Ar atom.

Larger charged argon clusters are also detectable in mass spectroscopy. The tetraargon cation is also linear.  icosahedral clusters have an  core, whereas  is dioctahedral with an  core. The linear  core has +0.1 charge on the outer atoms, and +0.4 charge on each or the inner atoms. For larger charged argon clusters, the charge is not distributed on more than four atoms. Instead the neutral outer atoms are attracted by induced electric polarization. The charged argon clusters absorb radiation, from the near infrared, through visible to ultraviolet. Its spectrum is modified by the first shell of neutral atoms attached. Larger clusters have the same spectrum as the smaller ones. When photons are absorbed in the chromophore, it is initially electronically excited, but then energy is transferred to the whole cluster in the form of vibration. Excess energy is removed by outer atoms evaporating from the cluster one at a time. The process of destroying a cluster by light is called photofragmentation.

Negatively-charged argon clusters are thermodynamically unstable, and therefore cannot exist. Argon has a negative electron affinity.

Argon monohydride
Neutral argon hydride, also known as argon monohydride (ArH), was the first discovered noble gas hydride. J. W. C. Johns discovered an emission line of ArH at 767 nm and announced the find in 1970. The molecule was synthesized using X-ray irradiation of mixtures of argon with hydrogen-rich molecules such as H2, H2O, CH4 and CH3OH. The X-ray excited argon atoms are in the 4p state.

Argon monohydride is unstable in its ground state, 4s, as a neutral inert gas atom and a hydrogen atom repel each other at normal intermolecular distances. When a higher-energy-level ArH* emits a photon and reaches the ground state, the atoms are too close to each other, and they repel and break up. However a van der Waals molecule can exist with a long bond. However, excited ArH* can form stable Rydberg molecules, also known as excimers. These Rydberg molecules can be considered as a protonated argon core, surrounded by an electron in one of many possible higher energy states.

Formation: Ar + ν → Ar*; Ar* + H2 → ArH* + H

Instead of dihydrogen, other hydrogen containing molecules can also have a hydrogen atom abstracted by excited argon, but note that some molecules bind hydrogen too strongly for the reaction to proceed. For example, acetylene will not form ArH this way.

In the van der Waals molecule of ArH, the bond length is calculated to be about 3.6 Å and the dissociation energy calculated to be 0.404 kJ/mol (33.8 cm−1). The bond length in ArH* is calculated as 1.302 Å.

The spectrum of argon monohydride, both ArH* and ArD*, has been studied. The lowest bound state is termed A2Σ+ or 5s. Another low lying state is known as 4p, made up of C2Σ+ and B2π states. Each transition to or from higher level states corresponds to a band. The transitions going to 5s, 3dπ → 5s and 5dπ → 5s, are strongly predissociated, blurring out the lines. In the UV spectrum a continuous band exists from 200 to 400 nm. This band is due to two different higher states: B2Π → A2Σ+ radiates over 210–450 nm, and E2Π → A2Σ+ is between 180 and 320 nm. A band in the near infrared from 760 to 780 nm.

Other ways to make ArH include a Penning-type discharge tube, or other electric discharges. Yet another way is to create a beam of ArH+ (argonium) ions and then neutralize them in laser-energized caesium vapour. By using a beam, the lifetimes of the different energy states can be observed, by measuring the profile of electromagnetic energy emitted at different wavelengths. The E2π state of ArH has a radiative lifetime of 40 ns. For ArD the lifetime is 61 ns. The B2Π state has a lifetime of 16.6 ns in ArH and 17 ns in ArD.

Argon polyhydrides
The argon dihydrogen cation  has been predicted to exist and to be detectable in the interstellar medium. However it has not been detected .  is predicted to be linear in the form Ar−H−H. The H−H distance is 0.94 Å. The dissociation barrier is only 2 kcal/mol (8 kJ/mol), and  readily loses a hydrogen atom to yield ArH+. The force constant of the ArH bond in this is 1.895 mdyne/Å2.

The argon trihydrogen cation  has been observed in the laboratory. ArH2D+,  and  have also been observed. The argon trihydrogen cation is planar in shape, with an argon atom off the vertex of a triangle of hydrogen atoms.

Argoxonium
The argoxonium ion ArOH+ is predicted to be bent molecular geometry in the 11A′ state. 3Σ− is a triplet state 0.12 eV higher in energy, and 3A″ is a triplet state 0.18 eV higher. The Ar−O bond is predicted to be 1.684 Å long and to have a force constant of 2.988 mdyne/Å2.

ArNH+
ArNH+ is a possible ionic molecule to detect in the lab, and in space, as the atoms that compose it are common. ArNH+ is predicted to be more weakly bound than ArOH+, with a force constant in the Ar−N bond of 1.866 mdyne/Å2. The angle at the nitrogen atom is predicted to be 97.116°. The Ar−N lengths should be 1.836 Å and the N−H bond length would be 1.046 Å

Argon dinitrogen cation
The argon dinitrogen linear cationic complex has also been detected in the lab:
Ar +  →   Ar+ + N2.
The dissociation yields Ar+, as this is a higher-energy state. The binding energy is 1.19 eV. The molecule is linear. The distance between two nitrogen atoms is 1.1 Å. This distance is similar to that of neutral N2 rather than that of  ion. The distance between one nitrogen and the argon atom is 2.2 Å.

In the process of photodissociation, it is three times more likely to yield Ar+ + N2 compared to Ar + .

has been produced in a supersonic jet expansion of gas and detected by Fourier transform microwave spectroscopy. The molecule is linear, with the atoms in the order Ar−H−N−N. The Ar−H distance is 1.864 Å. There is a stronger bond between hydrogen and argon than in ArHCO+.

The molecule is made by the following reaction:

ArH+ + N2 → .

Bis(dinitrogen) argon cation
The band origin of an infrared band due to antisymmetric vibration of the N=N bonds is at 2288.7272 cm−1. Compared to N2 it is redshifted 41.99 cm−1.

 is produced by a supersonic expansion of a 10:1 mixture of argon with nitrogen through a nozzle, which is impacted by an electron beam.

ArN2O+
ArN2O+ absorbs photons in four violet–ultraviolet wavelength bands leading to breakup of the molecule. The bands are 445–420, 415–390, 390–370, and 342 nm.

ArHCO+
ArHCO+ has been produced in a supersonic-jet expansion of gas and detected by Fabry–Perot-type Fourier transform microwave spectroscopy.

The molecule is made by this reaction

ArH+ + CO → ArHCO+.

Carbon dioxide–argon ion
 can be excited to form * where the positive charge is moved from the carbon dioxide part to the argon. This molecule may occur in the upper atmosphere. Experimentally the molecule is made from a low-pressure argon gas with 0.1% carbon dioxide, irradiated by a 150 V electron beam. Argon is ionized, and can transfer the charge to a carbon dioxide molecule.

 + CO2 → Ar +  (yields 0.435 eV.)

van der Waals molecules
Neutral argon atoms bind very weakly to other neutral atoms or molecules to form van der Waals molecules. These can be made by expanding argon under high pressure mixed with the atoms of another element. The expansion happens through a tiny hole into a vacuum, and results in cooling to temperatures a few degrees above absolute zero.  At higher temperatures the atoms will be too energetic to stay together by way of the weak London dispersion forces. The atoms that are to combine with argon can be produced by evaporation with a laser or alternatively by an electric discharge. The known molecules include AgAr, Ag2Ar, NaAr, KAr, MgAr, CaAr, SrAr, ZnAr, CdAr, HgAr, SiAr, InAr, CAr, GeAr, SnAr, and BAr. SiAr was made from silicon atoms derived from Si(CH3)4.

In addition to the very weakly bound van der Waals molecules, electronically-excited molecules with the same formula exist. As a formula these can be written ArX*, with the "*" indicating an excited state. The atoms are much more strongly bound with a covalent bond. They can be modeled as an ArX+ surrounded by a higher energy shell with one electron. This outer electron can change energy by exchanging photons and so can fluoresce. The widely used argon fluoride laser makes use of the ArF* excimer to produce strong ultraviolet radiation at 192 nm. The argon chloride laser using ArCl* produces even shorter ultraviolet at 175 nm, but is too feeble for application. The argon chloride in this laser comes from argon and chlorine molecules.

Argon clusters
Cooled argon gas can form clusters of atoms. Diargon, also known as the argon dimer, has a binding energy of 0.012 eV, but the Ar13 and Ar19 clusters have a sublimation energy (per atom) of 0.06 eV. For liquid argon, which could be written as Ar∞, the energy increases to 0.08 eV. Clusters of up to several hundred argon atoms have been detected. These argon clusters are icosahedral in shape, consisting of shells of atoms arranged around a central atom. The structure changes for clusters with more than 800 atoms to resemble a tiny crystal with a face-centered cubic (fcc) structure, as in solid argon. It is the surface energy that maintains an icosahedral shape, but for larger clusters internal pressure will attract the atoms into an fcc arrangement. Neutral argon clusters are transparent to visible light.

Diatomic van der Waals molecules
{|class="wikitable"
!Molecule
!Binding energyground Σ state(cm−1)
!Binding energyexcited Π state(cm−1)
!Ground statebond length(Å)
!Excited statebond length(Å)
!CAS number
|-
|ArH
|
|
|
|
|30736-04-0
|-
|ArHe
|
|
|
|
|12254-69-2
|-
|LiAr
|42.5
|925
|4.89
|2.48
|
|-
|BAr
|
|
|
|
|149358-32-7
|-
|ArNe
|
|
|
|
|12301-65-4
|-
|NaAr
|40
|560
|
|
|56633-38-6
|-
|MgAr
|44
|246
|
|
|72052-59-6
|-
|AlAr
|
|
|
|
|143752-09-4
|-
|SiAr
|
|
|
|
|
|-
|ArCl
|
|
|
|
|54635-29-9
|-
|Ar2
|
|
|
|
|12595-59-4
|-
|KAr
|42
|373
|
|
|12446-47-8
|-
|CaAr
|62
|134
|
|
|72052-60-9
|-
|SrAr
|68
|136
|
|
|
|-
|NiAr
|
|
|
|
|401838-48-0
|-
|ZnAr
|96
|706
|
|
|72052-61-0
|-
|GaAr
|
|
|
|
|149690-22-2
|-
|GeAr
|
|
|
|
|
|-
|KrAr
|
|
|
|
|51184-77-1
|-
|AgAr
|90
|1200
|
|
|
|-
|CdAr
|106
|544
|
|
|72052-62-1
|-
|InAr
|
|
|
|
|146021-90-1
|-
|SnAr
|
|
|
|
|
|-
|ArXe
|
|
|
|
|58206-67-0
|-
|AuAr
|
|
|
|
|195245-92-2
|-
|HgAr
|131
|446
|
|
|87193-95-1
|}

ArO* is also formed when dioxygen trapped in an argon matrix is subjected to vacuum ultraviolet. It can be detected by its luminescence:
O2 + hv →  + e−;  + e− → 2O*; O* + Ar → ArO*.
Light emitted by ArO* has two main bands, one at 2.215 eV, and a weaker one at 2.195 eV.

Argon sulfide, ArS* luminesces in the near infrared at 1.62 eV. ArS is made from UV irradiated OCS in an argon matrix. The excited states lasts for 7.4 and 3.5 μs for spectrum peak and band respectively.

Triatomic van der Waals molecules
Cluster molecules containing dichlorine and more than one argon atom can be made by forcing a 95:5 mixture of helium and argon and a trace of chlorine though a nozzle. ArCl2 exists in a T shape. Ar2Cl2 has a distorted tetrahedron shape, with the two argon atoms 4.1 Å from each other, and their axis 3.9 Å from the Cl2. The van der Waals bond energy is 447 cm−1. Ar3Cl2 also exists with a van der Waals bond energy of 776 cm−1.

The linear Ar·Br2 molecule has a continuous spectrum for bromine molecule X → B transitions. The spectrum of bromine is blue-shifted and spread out when it binds an argon atom.

ArI2 shows a spectrum that adds satellite bands to the higher vibrational bands of I2. The ArI2 molecule has two different isomers, one shape is linear, and the other is T shaped. The dynamics of ArI2 is complex. Breakup occurs through different routes in the two isomers. The T shape undergoes intramolecular vibrational relaxation, whereas the linear one directly breaks apart. Diiodine clusters, I2Arn have been made.

The ArClF cluster has a linear shape. The argon atom is closest to the chlorine atom.

Linear ArBrCl can also rearrange to ArClBr, or a T-shaped isomer.

Multiple argon atoms can "solvate" a water molecule forming a monolayer around the H2O. Ar12·H2O is particularly stable, having an icosahedral shape. Molecules from Ar·H2O to Ar14·H2O have been studied.

ArBH was produced from boron monohydride (BH) which in turn was created from diborane by way of an ultraviolet 193 nm laser. The BH-argon mixture was expanded through a 0.2 mm diameter nozzle into a vacuum. The gas mixture cools and Ar and BH combine to yield ArBH. A band spectrum that combines the A1Π←X1Σ+ electronic transition, with vibration and rotation can be observed. The BH has singlet spin, and this is the first known van der Waals complex with a singlet spin pair of atoms. For this molecule the rotational constant is 0.133 cm−1, The dissociation energy is 92 cm−1 and distance from argon to boron atom is 3.70 Å. ArAlH is also known to exist.

MgAr2 is also known.

Polyatomic van der Waals molecules
Some linear polyatomic molecules can form T shaped van der Waals complexes with argon.  These include NCCN, carbon dioxide, nitrous oxide, acetylene, carbon oxysulfide, and ClCN.  Others attach the argon atom at one end to continue to be linear, including HCN.

Other polyatomic van der Waals compounds of argon, include those of fluorobenzene, formyl radical (ArHCO), 7-azaindole, glyoxal, sodium chloride (ArNaCl), ArHCl, and cyclopentanone.

{|class="wikitable"
!Molecule
!Name
!Ground statebinding energy(cm−1)
!Closest position or atomto argon
!Ground statebond length of Ar(Å)
!Bond anglefrom atom(degrees)
!Bond stretch force or frequency
!dipole moment D
!CAS number
!references
|-
|(CH3)2F2Si·Ar
| Difluorodimethylsilane – argon
|
|
|
|
|
|
|
|
|-
|CH2F2·Ar
|Difluoromethane – argon
|
|F
|3.485
|58.6
|
|
|
| 
|-
|CF3CN
|trifluoromethylcyanide argon
|
|C1
|3.73
|77
|
|
|947504-98-5
|
|-
||CF2HCH3·Ar
|1,1-difluoroethane argon
|
|F
|
|
|
|
| –
|
|-
|CH2FCH2F·Ar
|1,2-difluoroethane argon
|181
|F
|3.576
|61
|
|
|264131-14-8
|
|-
|CH3CHO·Ar
|Acetaldehyde argon
|161
|C-1
|3.567
|76.34
|
|
|158885-13-3
|
|-
|C2H4O·Ar
|oxirane argon
|200
|O
|3.606 (CM)
|72.34
|
|
|
|
|-
|ArBF3
|Boron trifluoride argon
|
|B
|3.325
|on axis ArBF ≈90.5°
|0.030 mdyn/Å
|0.176
|
|
|-
|ArC6H6
|benzene-argon
|
|on sixfold axis
|3.53 from plane
|
|
|0.12
|
|
|-
|ArPF3
|argon phosphorus trifluoride complex
|
|P
|3.953 from centre of mass
|70.3° on PF2 face
|
|
|
|
|-
|Ar-NCCN
|argon–cyanogen van der Waals complex
|
|centre of molecule
|3.58
|90° T shape
|30 cm−1
|0.0979
|
|
|-
|DCCDAr
|argon-deuterated acetylene
|
|centre of molecule
|3.25
|90° T shape
|0.0008 mdyn/Å / 8.7 cm−1
|
|
|
|-
|SO3Ar
|sulfur trioxide argon
|
|S
|3.350
|on axis 90° from SO bond
|0.059 mdyn/Å / 61 cm−1
|
|
|
|-
|Ar•HCCH
|acetylene argon
|
|
|
|T shape
|
|
|
|
|-
|OCS•Ar|| || || || || || || || ||
|-
|CH3OH•Ar|| || || || || || || || ||
|-
|CH3Cl•Ar|| || || || || || || || ||
|-
|
|Pyridine argon|| || || || || || || ||
|-
|
|Pyrrole argon|| || || || || || || ||
|}

Aqueous argon
Argon dissolved in water causes the pH to rise to 8.0, apparently by reducing the number of oxygen atoms available to bind protons.

With ice, argon forms a clathrate hydrate. Up to 0.6 GPa, the clathrate has a cubic structure. Between 0.7 and 1.1 GPa the clathrate has a tetragonal structure. Between 1.1 and 6.0 GPa the structure is body centered orthorhombic. Over 6.1 GPa, the clathrate converts into solid argon and ice VII. At atmospheric pressure the clathrate is stable below 147 K. At 295 K the argon pressure from the clathrate is 108 MPa.

Argon fluorohydride
Argon fluorohydride was an important discovery in the rejuvenation of the study of noble gas chemistry. HArF is stable in solid form at temperatures below 17 K. It is prepared by photolysis of hydrogen fluoride in a solid argon matrix. HArArF would have such a low barrier to decomposition that it will likely never be observed. However HBeArF is predicted to be more stable than HArF.

Uranium compounds
CUO in a solid argon matrix can bind one, or a few argon atoms to yield CUO·Ar, CUO·Ar3 or CUO·Ar4. CUO itself is made by evaporating uranium atoms into carbon monoxide. Uranium acts as a strong Lewis acid in CUO and forms bonds with energies of about 3.2 kcal/mol (13.4 kJ/mol) with argon. The argon acts as a Lewis base. Its electron density is inserted into an empty 6d orbital on the uranium atom. The spectrum of CUO is changed by argon so that the U−O stretch frequency changes from 872.2 to 804.3 cm−1 and the U−C stretch frequency from 1047.3 to 852.5 cm−1. The significant change in the spectrum occurs because the CUO is changed from a singlet state (in gas phase or solid neon) to a triplet state, with argon or noble gas complexing. The argon–uranium bond length is 3.16 Å. This is shorter than the sum of atomic radii of U and Ar of 3.25 Å, but considerably longer than a normal covalent bond to uranium. For example, U−Cl in UCl6 is 2.49 Å. When xenon is included in the solid argon matrix up to a few percent, additional van der Waals molecules are formed: CUO·Ar3Xe, CUO·Ar2Xe2, CUO·ArXe3 and CUO·Xe4. Similarly krypton can substitute for argon in CUO·Ar3Kr, CUO·Ar2Kr2, CUO·ArKr3 and CUO·Kr4. The shape of these molecules is roughly octahedral, with a uranium centre and with the noble gas atoms around the equator.

 can bind up to five noble gas atoms in a ring around a linear O==O core. These molecules are produced when uranium metal is laser ablated into dioxygen. This produces UO, UO2, UO3, U+, and importantly .  is then condensed into a noble gas matrix, either a pure element or a mixture. Heavier noble gas atoms will tend to displace the lighter atoms.

Neutral UO2 condensed in solid argon is converted from one electronic state to another by the argon atom ligands. In argon the electron configuration is 5f2(δφ) whereas in neon it is 5f17s1 (the state 3H4g compared to 3Φ2u). This is because the argon atoms have a larger antibonding interaction with the 7s1 electron, forcing it into a different subshell. The argonated compound has a stretching frequency of 776 cm−1 compared to 914.8 cm−1 in neon. The argon uranium dioxide molecule is likely UO2Ar5.

Beryllium oxide
When beryllium atoms react with oxygen in a solid argon matrix (or beryllia is evaporated into the matrix) ArBeO will be formed, and is observable by its infrared spectrum. The beryllia molecule is strongly polarised, and the argon atom is attracted to the beryllium atom. The bond strength of Ar−Be is calculated to be 6.7 kcal/mol (28 kJ/mol). The Ar−Be bond length is predicted to be 2.042 Å.

The cyclic Be2O2 molecule can bind two argon atoms, or one argon along with another noble gas atom.

Analogously, beryllium reacting with hydrogen sulfide and trapped in an argon matrix at 4 K forms ArBeS. It has a binding energy calculated to be 12.8 kcal/mol (54 kJ/mol).

ArBeO2CO (beryllium carbonate) has been prepared (along with Ne, Kr and Xe adducts).

The cyclic beryllium sulfite molecule can also coordinate an argon atom onto the beryllium atom in solid neon or argon matrix.

Carbonyl compounds
Group 6 elements can form reactive pentacarbonyls that can react with argon. These were actually argon compounds discovered in 1975, and were known before the discovery of HArF, but are usually overlooked. Tungsten normally forms a hexacarbonyl, but when subject to ultraviolet radiation it breaks into a reactive pentacarbonyl. When this is condensed into a noble gas matrix the infrared and UV spectrum varies considerably depending on the noble gas used. This is because the noble gas present binds to the vacant position on the tungsten atom. Similar results also occur with molybdenum and chromium. Argon is only very weakly bound to tungsten in ArW(CO)5. The Ar−W bondlength is predicted to be 2.852 Å. The same substance is produced for a brief time in supercritical argon at 21 °C. For ArCr(CO)5 the band maximum is at 533 nm (compared to 624 nm in neon, and 518 nm in krypton). Forming 18-electron complexes, the shift in spectrum due to different matrices was much smaller, only around 5 nm. This clearly indicates the formation of a molecule using atoms from the matrix.

Other carbonyls and complexed carbonyls also have reports of bonding to argon. These include Ru(CO)2(PMe3)2Ar, Ru(CO)2(dmpe)2Ar, η6-C6H6Cr(CO)2Ar. Evidence also exists for ArHMn(CO)4, ArCH3Mn(CO)4, and fac-(η2-dfepe)Cr(CO)3Ar.

Other noble gas complexes have been studied by photolysis of carbonyls dissolved in liquid rare gas, possibly under pressure. These Kr or Xe complexes decay on the time scale of seconds, but argon does not seem to have been studied this way. The advantage of liquid noble gases is that the medium is completely transparent to infrared radiation, which is needed to study the bond vibration in the solute.

Attempts have been made to study carbonyl–argon adducts in the gas phase, but the interaction appears to be too weak to observe a spectrum. In the gas form, the absorption lines are broadened into bands because of rotation that happens freely in a gas. The argon adducts in liquids or gases are unstable as the molecules easily react with the other photolysis products, or dimerize, eliminating argon.

Coinage metal monohalides
The argon coinage metal monohalides were the first noble gas metal halides discovered, when the metal monohalide molecules were put through an argon jet. There were first found in Vancouver in 2000.
ArMX with M = Cu, Ag or Au and X = F, Cl or Br have been prepared. The molecules are linear. In ArAuCl the Ar−Au bond is 2.47 Å, the stretching frequency is 198 cm−1 and the dissociation energy is 47 kJ/mol. ArAgBr also has been made. ArAgF has a dissociation energy of 21 kJ/mol. The Ar−Ag bond-length in these molecules is 2.6 Å. The Ar−Cu bond length in these molecules is 2.25 Å.

Transition metal oxides
In a solid argon matrix VO2 forms VO2Ar2, and VO4 forms VO4·Ar with binding energy calculated to be 12.8 and 5.0 kcal/mol (53 and 21 kJ/mol). Scandium in the form of ScO+ coordinates five argon atoms to yield . these argon atoms can be substituted by numbers of krypton or xenon atoms to yield even more mixed noble gas molecules. With yttrium, YO+ bonds six argon atoms, and these too can be substituted by varying numbers of krypton or xenon atoms.

In the case of transition metal monoxides, ScO, TiO and VO do not form a molecule with one argon atom. However CrO, MnO, FeO, CoO and NiO can each coordinate one argon atom in a solid argon matrix. The metal monoxide molecules can be produced by laser ablation of the metal trioxide, followed by condensation on solid argon. ArCrO absorbs at 846.3 cm−1, ArMnO at 833.1, ArFeO at 872.8, ArCoO at 846.2, Ar58NiO at 825.7 and Ar60NiO at 822.8 cm−1. All these molecules are linear.

There are also claims of argon forming coordination molecules in NbO2Ar2, NbO4Ar, TaO4Ar, VO2Ar2, VO4Ar, Rh(η2-O2)Ar2, Rh(η2-O2)2Ar2, Rh(η2-O2)2(η1-OO)Ar.

Tungsten trioxide, WO3, and tungsten dioxide mono-superoxide (η2-O2)WO2 can both coordinate argon in an argon matrix. The argon can be replaced by xenon or molecular oxygen to make xenon coordinated compounds or superoxides. For WO3Ar the binding energy is 9.4 kcal/mol and for (η2-O2)WO2 it is 8.1 kcal/mol.

Other transition metal compounds
ArNiN2 binds argon with 11.52 kcal/mol. The bending frequency of ArN2 is changed from 310.7 to 358.7 cm−1 when argon attaches to the nickel atom.

Other ions

Gold and silver cluster ions can bind argon. These have a triangular shaped metallic core with argon bound at the vertexes.

ArF+ is also known to be formed in the reaction
 + Ar → ArF+ + F
and also
Ar+ + F2 → ArF+ + F.
and also
SF + Ar → ArF+ + SF.
The ions can be produced by ultraviolet light at 79.1 nm or less. The ionisation energy of fluorine is higher than that of argon, so breakup occurs thus:
ArF+ → Ar+ + F.
The millimeter wave spectrum of ArF+ between 119.0232 and 505.3155 GHz has been measured to calculate molecular constants B0 = , D0 = 28.718 kHz.

Excited or ionized argon atoms can react with molecular iodine gas to yield ArI+
Argon plasma is used as an ionisation source and carrier gas in inductively coupled plasma mass spectrometry. This plasma reacts with samples to produce monatomic ions, but also forms argon oxide (ArO+), and argon nitride (ArN+) cations, which can cause isobaric interference with detection and measurement of iron-56 (56Fe) and iron-54 (54Fe), respectively, in mass spectrometry. Platinum present in stainless steel can form platinum argide (PtAr+) which interferes with the detection of uranium-234 which can be used as a tracer in aquifers. Argon chloride cations can interfere with the detection of arsenic as Ar35Cl+ has a mass-to-charge ratio almost identical to that of arsenic's one stable isotope, 75As. In these circumstances ArO+ may be removed by reaction with NH3. Alternatively electrothermal vaporization or using helium gas can avoid these interference problems. Argon can also form an anion with chlorine, ArCl−, though this is not a problem for mass spectrometry applications as only cations are detected.

The argon borynium ion, BAr+ is produced when BBr+ at energies between 9 and 11 eV reacts with argon atoms. 90% of the positive charge is on the argon atom.

ArC+ ions can be formed when argon ions impact carbon monoxide with energies between 21 and 60 eV. However more C+ ions are formed, and when the energy is on the high side, O+ is higher.

ArN+ can form when argon ions impact dinitrogen with energies between 8.2 and 41.2 eV and peaking around 35 eV. However far more  and N+ are produced.

ArXe+ is held together with a strength of 1445 cm−1 when it is in the X electronic state, but 1013 cm−1 when it is in the B excited state.

Metal–argon cations are called "argides". The argide ions produced during mass spectroscopy have higher intensity when the binding energy of the ion is higher. Transition elements have higher binding and ion flux intensity compared to main group elements. Argides can be formed in the plasma by excited argon atoms reacting with another element atom, or by an argon atom binding with another ion:
Ar+ + M → ArM+ + e−; M+ + Ar → ArM+.

Doubly charged cations, called superelectrophiles, are capable of reacting with argon. Ions produced include ArCF ArCH, ArBF and ArBF containing bonds between argon and carbon or boron.

Doubly ionised acetylene HCCH2+ reacts inefficiently with argon to yield HCCAr2+.  This product competes with the formation of Ar+ and argonium.

The SiF ion reacts with argon to yield ArSiF.

{|class="wikitable"
!Ion
!Bond length(Å)
!Dissociation energy(kJ/mol)
!Excited statebond length (Å)
!Excited statedissociation energy
|-
|ArH+
|
|3.4 eV
|-
|LiAr+
|2.343
|0.30 eV
|-
|BeAr+
|
|4100 cm−1
|-
|BAr+
|2.590
|210
|-
|ArC+
|
|
|-
|ArN+
|3.5
|2.16 eV
|-
|ArO+
|
|
|-
|ArF+
|1.637
|194
|-
|NaAr+
|
|19.3
|-
|MgAr+
|2.88
|1200 cm−1
|-
|AlAr+
|
|982 cm−1
|-
|SiAr+
|
|
|-
|ArP+
|
|
|-
|ArS+
|
|
|-
|ArCl+
|
|
|-
|
|
|
|-
|CaAr+
|
|700 cm−1
|-
|ScAr+
|
|
|-
|TiAr+
|
|0.31eV
|-
|VAr+
|2.65
|37,D0=2974 cm−1
|-
|CrAr+
|
|28,D0=2340
|-
|MnAr+
|
|0.149 eV
|-
|FeAr+
|
|0.11 eV
|-
|CoAr+
|2.385
|49,D0=4111 cm−1
|-
|NiAr+
|
|53,D0=4572
|-
|CuAr+
|
|0.53 eV
|-
|ZnAr+
|2.72
|0.25 eV, D0=2706 cm−1
|-
|GaAr+
|
|
|-
|AsAr+
|
|
|-
|RbAr+
|
|
|-
|SrAr+
|
|800
|-
|ZrAr+
|2.72
|D0 = 2706 cm−1
|3.050
|1179 cm−1
|-
|NbAr+
|2.677
|37,D0=3106 cm−1
|-
|AgAr+
|
|
|-
|InAr+
|
|
|-
|ArI+
|
|
|-
|BaAr+
|
|600 cm−1
|}

Polyatomic cations

Metal ions can also form with more than one argon atom, in a kind of argon metal cluster. Different sized metal ions at the centre of a cluster can fit different geometries of argons atoms around the ion.  Argides with multiple argon atoms have been detected in mass spectrometry. These can have variable numbers of argon attached, but there are magic numbers, where the complex more commonly has a particular number, either four or six argon atoms. These can be studied by time of flight mass spectrometer analysis and by the photodissociation spectrum. Other study methods include Coulomb explosion analysis. Argon-tagging is a technique whereby argon atoms are weakly bound to a molecule under study.  It results in a much lower temperature of the tagged molecules, with sharper infra-red absorption lines.  The argon-tagged molecules can be disrupted by photons of a particular wavelength.

Lithium ions add argon atoms to form clusters with more than a hundred argon atoms. The clusters Li+Ar4, and Li+Ar4 are particularly stable and common. Calculations show that the small clusters are all quite symmetrical. Li+Ar2 is linear, Li+Ar3 is flat and triangular shaped with D3h symmetry, Li+Ar4 is tetrahedral, Li+Ar5 could be a square pyramid or trigonal bipyramid shape. Li+Ar6 is an octahedron shape with Li at the centre. Li+Ar7 or slightly larger clusters have a core octahedron of argon atoms with one or more triangular faces capped by other argon atoms.  The bonding is much weaker, which explains their greater scarcity.

Sodium forms clusters with argon atoms with peaks at numbers of 8, 10, 16, 20, 23, 25 and 29, and also at the icosahedral numbers of 47, 50, 57, 60, 63, 77, 80, 116 and 147 argon atoms. This includes the square antiprism (8) and the capped square antiprism (10 atoms).
In Ti+Ar1−n the argon atoms induce a mixing of the ground electronic state of 3d24s1 with 3d34s0.  When a plasma of titanium in expanding argon gas is made via a laser, clusters from Ti+Ar up to Ti+Ar50 are formed.  But Ti+Ar6 is much more common than all the others.  In this the six argon atoms are arranged in an octahedron shape around the central titanium ion. For Ti+Ar2 DFT calculations predict it is linear, Ti+Ar3 is not even flat, and has one short and two longer Ti-Ar bonds. Ti+Ar4 is a distorted tetrahedron, with one longer Ti-Ar bond. Ti+Ar5 is an asymmetrical trigonal bipyramid shape with one bond shorter. For clusters with seven or more argon atoms, the structure contains a Ti+Ar6 octahedton with triangular faces caped by more argon atoms.

Cu+Ar2 is predicted to be linear. Cu+Ar3 is predicted to be planar T shaped with an Ar-Cu-Ar angle of 93°. Cu+Ar4 is predicted to be rhombic planar (not square or tetrahedral). For alkali and alkaline earth metals the M+Ar4 cluster is tetrahedral. Cu+Ar5 is predicted to have a rhombic pyramid shape. Cu+Ar6 has a flattened octahedral shape. Cu+Ar7 is much less stable, and the seventh argon atom is outside an inner shell of six argon atoms.  This is called capped octahedral. A complete second shell of argon atoms yields Cu+Ar34. Above this number a structural change takes place with an icosahedral arrangement with Cu+Ar55 and Cu+Ar146 having more stability.

With a strontium ion Sr+ from two to eight argon atoms can form clusters. Sr+Ar2 has a triangle shape with C2v symmetry. Sr+Ar3 has a trigonal pyramid shape with C3v symmetry. Sr+Ar4 has two trigonal pyramids sharing a face and strontium at the common apex. It has a C2v symmetry. Sr+Ar6 has a pentagonal pyramid of argon atoms with the strontium atom below the base.

Niobium tetraargide, Nb+Ar4 probably has the argon atoms arranged in a square around the niobium. Similarly for vanadium tetraargide, V+Ar4. The hexaargides, Co+Ar6 and Rh+Ar6 likely have octahedral argon arrangement.
Indium monocation forms clusters with multiple argon, with magic numbers at 12, 18, 22, 25, 28, 45 and 54, and 70 argon atoms, which are numbers for icosahedral shapes.

By zapping copper metal with a UV laser in an argon-carbon monoxide mixture, argon tagged copper carbonyl cations are formed. These ions can be studied by observing which wavelengths of infrared radiation cause the molecules to break up. These molecular ions include CuCO+Ar, Cu(CO)2+Ar, Cu(CO)3+Ar, Cu(CO)4+Ar which are respectively disrupted to lose argon, by infrared wavenumbers 2216, 2221, 2205 and 2194 cm−1 respectively. The argon binding energy is respectively 16.3, 1.01, 0.97 and 0.23 kcal/mol. The infrared absorption peak for Cu(CO)3+Ar is 2205 cm−1 compared to 2199 cm−1 for Cu(CO)3+. For Cu(CO)4+Ar the peak is at 2198 cm−1 compared to 2193 for Cu(CO)4+. For Cu(CO)2+Ar the peak is at 2221 cm−1 compared to 2218.3 for argon free, and for CuCO+Ar the peak is at 2216 cm−1 considerably different to 2240.6 cm−1 for CuCO+. Computationally predicted shapes for these molecular ions are linear for CuCO+Ar, slightly bent T shaped for Cu(CO)2+Ar and a trigonal pyramid with argon at the top and a flat star like copper tricarbonyl forming the base.

Ions studied by argon tagging include the hydrated proton H+(H2O)nAr with n=2 to 5, hydrated 18-crown-6 ether alkali metal ions, hydrated alkali metal ions, transition metal acetylene complexes, protonated ethylene, and IrO4+.

Argon methyl cations, (or methyliumargon) ArxCH3+ are known for n=1 to 8. CH3+ is a Y shape, and when argon atoms are added they go above and below the plane of the Y. If more argon atoms are added they line up with the hydrogen atoms. ΔH0 for ArCH3+ is 11 kcal/mol, and for Ar2CH3+ it is 13.5 kcal/mol (for 2Ar + CH3+).

Boroxyl ring cationic complexes with argon [ArB3O4]+, [ArB3O5]+, [ArB4O6]+ and [ArB5O7]+ were prepared via a laser vaporization at cryogenic temperatures and investigated by infrared gas phase spectroscopy. They were the first large stable gas phase complexes that feature strong dative bonding between argon and boron.

Dications 
Dications with argon are known for the coinage metals. Known dications include CuArn2+ and AgArn2+ for n=1-8, with a peak occurrence of CuAr42+, or AgAr42+, and AuArn2+ n=3–7.  In addition to the four argon atoms, the six argon atoms clusters have enhanced concentration. The stability of the ions with two positive charges is unexpected as the ionization energy of argon is lower than the second ionization energy of the metal atom.  So the positive second charge on the metal atom should move to the argon, ionizing it, and then forming a highly repulsive molecule that undergoes a Coulomb explosion. However these molecules appear to be kinetically stable, and to transfer the charge to an argon atom, they have to pass through a higher energy state. The clusters with four argon atoms are expected to be square planar, and those with six, to be octahedral distorted by the Jahn–Teller effect.

Polyatomic anions 

Examples of anions containing strong bonds with noble gases are extremely rare: generally nucleophilic nature of anions results in their inability to bind to noble gases with their negative electron affinity. However, the 2017 discovery of "superelectrophilic anions", gas phase fragmentation products of closo-dodecaborates, led to the observation of stable anionic compounds containing a boron-noble gas bond with significant degree of covalent interaction. The most reactive superelectrophilic anion [B12(CN)11]−, fragmentation product of cyanated cluster [B12(CN)12]2-, was reported to bind argon spontaneously at room temperature.

Solid compounds
Armand Gautier noticed that rock contained argon (and also nitrogen) that was liberated when the rock was dissolved in acid however how the argon was combined in rock was ignored by the scientific community.

Fullerene solvates
Solid buckminsterfullerene has small spaces between the C60 balls. Under 200 MPa pressure and 200 °C heat for 12 hours, argon can be intercalated into the solid to form crystalline Ar1C60. Once this cools down it is stable at standard conditions for months. Argon atoms occupy octahedral interstitial sites. The crystalline lattice size is almost unchanged at room temperature, but is slightly larger than pure C60 below 265 K. However argon does stop the buckyballs spinning below 250 K, a lower temperature than in pure C60.

Solid C70 fullerene will also absorb argon under pressure of 200 MPa and at a temperature of 200 °C. C70·Ar has argon in octahedral sites and has the rock salt structure, with cubic crystals in which the lattice parameter is 15.001 Å. This compares to the pure C70 lattice parameter of 14.964 Å, so the argon forces the crystals to expand slightly. The C70 ellipsoidal balls rotate freely in the solid, they are not locked into position by extra argon atoms filling the holes. Argon gradually escapes over a couple of days when the solid is stored at standard conditions, so that C70·Ar is less stable than C60·Ar. This is likely to be due to the shape and internal rotation allowing channels through which Ar atoms can move.

When fullerenes are dissolved and crystallized from toluene, solids may form with toluene included as part of the crystal. However, if this crystallization is performed under a high pressure argon atmosphere, toluene is not included, being replaced by argon. The argon is then removed from the resultant crystal by heating to produce unsolvated solid fullerene.

Clathrate
Argon forms a clathrate with hydroquinone (HOC6H4OH)3•Ar. When crystallised from benzene under a pressure of 20 atmospheres of argon, a well defined structure containing argon results. An argon-phenol clathrate 4C6H5OH•Ar is also known. It has a binding energy of 40 kJ/mol. Other substituted phenols can also crystallise with argon.
The argon water clathrate is described in the Aqueous argon section.

Argon difluoride
Argon difluoride, ArF2, is predicted to be stable at pressures over 57 GPa. It should be an electrical insulator.

Ne2Ar and Ar2Ne
At around 4 K there are two phases where neon and argon are mixed as a solid: Ne2Ar and Ar2Ne. With Kr, solid argon forms a disorganized mixture.

ArH4
Under high pressure stoichiometric solids are formed with hydrogen and oxygen: Ar(H2)2 and Ar(O2)3.

Ar(H2)2 crystallises in the hexagonal C14 MgZn2 Laves phase. It is stable to at least 200 GPa, but is predicted to change at 250 GPa to an AlB2 structure. At even higher pressures the hydrogen molecules should break up followed by metallization.

ArO and ArO6
Oxygen and argon under pressure at room temperature form several different alloys with different crystal structures. Argon atoms and oxygen molecules are similar in size, so that a greater range of miscibility occurs compared to other gas mixtures. Solid argon can dissolve up to 5% oxygen without changing structure. Below 50% oxygen a hexagonal close packed phase exists. This is stable from about 3GPa to 8.5 GPa. Typical formula is ArO. With more oxygen between 5.5 and 7 GPa, a cubic Pm3n structure exists, but under higher pressure it changes to a I-42d space group form. With more than 8.5 GPa these alloys separate to solid argon and ε-oxygen. The cubic structure has a unit cell edge of 5.7828 Å at 6.9 GPa. The representative formula is Ar(O2)3.

ArHe2
Using density-functional theory ArHe2 is predicted to exist with the MgCu2 Laves phase structure at high pressures below 13.8 GPa. Above 13.8 GPa it transforms to AlB2 structure.

Ar-TON
Under pressure argon inserts into zeolite. Argon has an atomic radius of 1.8 Å, so it can insert into pores if they are big enough. Each unit cell of the TON zeolite can contain up to 5 atoms of argon, compared to 12 of neon. Argon infused TON zeolite (Ar-TON) is more compressible than Ne-TON as the unoccupied pores become elliptical under increased pressure. When Ar-TON is brought to atmospheric pressure, the argon only desorbs slowly, so that some remains in the solid without external pressure for a day.

Nickel argide
At 140 GPa and 1500K nickel and argon form an alloy, NiAr. NiAr is stable at room temperature and a pressure as low as 99 GPa. It has a face-centred cubic (fcc) structure. The compound is metallic. Each nickel atom loses 0.2 electrons to an argon atom which is thereby an oxidant. This contrasts with Ni3Xe, in which nickel is the oxidant. The volume of the ArNi compound is 5% less than that of the separate elements at these pressures. If this compound exists in the core of the Earth it could explain why only half the argon-40 that should be produced during the radioactive decay that produces geothermal heating seems to exist on the Earth.

See also 
Organoargon chemistry

References

External links

 
Chemical compounds by element
Compounds
Noble gas compounds